Miriam Hall, born November 17, 1877, was an American tennis player of the start of the 20th century. She was the first female from San Francisco to draw national attention when she lost the 1903 U.S. Women's National Championship doubles finals with partner Marion Jones of Southern California. Notably, in 1904, she won the women's doubles at the U.S. Women's National Championship with 17-year-old May Sutton. Circa 1911, she attended University of California, Berkeley, where she became its top player for the next few years while in her 30s. She wrote an instructional book Tennis for Girls in 1914. She coached tennis, including serving as women's tennis coach of UC-Berkeley for at least the 1915 season. She later taught tennis at a private school in Berkeley. She never married and died in Alameda County, California on June 18, 1954.

Grand Slam finals

Doubles (1 title, 1 runner-up)

1877 births
1954 deaths
American female tennis players
United States National champions (tennis)
Grand Slam (tennis) champions in women's doubles